Hakla (sometimes spelt Haklah) (Urdu: ہکلہ)  is a village located in the Gujrat District of the Punjab province of Pakistan. It is a part of the Panjan Kissana Union Council. It comes under the administration of the Kharian Tehsil.

Geography 
It lies midway between Lahore and  Islamabad near Grand trunk road.

Demographics 
The majority belongs to the Gujjar tribe. The Kundowana sub-caste of the Gujjars dominates the village. The dominant language of the people is Punjabi and the majority speaks it with Gujjar Majhi dialect. Urdu and English understood and spoken by sizeable population.

Economy 
Until the late 1970s agriculture and the army were the predominant occupations. Then until the mid-1980s many workers found jobs in the Middle East, especially Bahrain and KSA. Later Hakla people began working and living in Europe, mainly Greece, France, Italy, Spain, Germany and England. Some are well settled in the US and Canada. Irrigation-based agriculture operates.

Transport 
Chak Perana railway station is nearby.

History 
The history of Hakla began in the time of Alexander The Great's invasion of India. One of his Macedonian soldiers had a similar name to Hakla got injured in the Battle of the Hydaspes and recovered in the city of Bucephala (a city founded in order to commemorate the death of Alexander's horse, Sarosh). He and his family along with a others migrated to the present site of Hakla and established a small hut. The population of the settlement grew, but due to its distance from water sources, Hakla did not become a major population centre. The arrival of the Mughals in the early 15th century sparked an influx of people and subsequently Gujjar, Jat, Rajput and Sikh families began settling in the area.

References

Populated places in Gujrat District